The  opened in Sapporo, Hokkaidō, Japan in 1999. The collection comprises some four million materials, including thirteen thousand type specimens, amassed by Hokkaido University in the hundred and fifty years since the foundation in of its predecessor, the Sapporo Agricultural College, in 1876.

See also
 List of Cultural Properties of Japan - archaeological materials (Hokkaidō)
 List of Cultural Properties of Japan - historical materials (Hokkaidō)
 List of Cultural Properties of Japan - paintings (Hokkaidō)
 List of Historic Sites of Japan (Hokkaidō)
 Hokkaido Museum

References

External links

 Hokkaido University Museum

Museums in Sapporo
University museums in Japan
Museums established in 1999
1999 establishments in Japan